Viera High School is a public high school located in Viera, Florida, United States. It is part of the Brevard County School District.

History 

It was the fifteenth high school in the district and the first of the 21st Century Classroom schools in the county. 
The school opened on August 9, 2006, with a student body of 961 and 64 faculty and staff.

Campus
The school is located on a  campus with a student capacity of 2,338. The estimated budget for the project is $46,000,000. H. J. High Construction Company was contracted to design and build the facility.

Academics
In 2011, students averaged a score of 71 on the advanced-placement examinations, among the highest in the region. The School also provides multiple academic programs:

Athletics
The school fields teams in 16 different sports including Football, Baseball, Cross Country, and Volleyball. Including two state championships for the girls' golf team in 2010 and 2014.

The girls won the school's 4A state championship in soccer in 2014-15.

In 2017, the football team competes in the 7A class.

Men's Cross Country won 4A State Championship in 2021.

Activities
The school offers students the following activities:

Notable alumni
 David McKay, professional baseball player
TJ Nyman, professional skater
Katie Stengel, professional soccer player 
Tre Nixon, professional football player

References

High schools in Brevard County, Florida
Educational institutions established in 2006
Public high schools in Florida
2006 establishments in Florida